Accra is a genus of tortrix moths in the subfamily Tortricinae and tribe Tortricini. Accra was established in 1964 by Józef Razowski, with Argyrotoxa viridis as  type species.

Species
As of November 2019, the Online World Catalogue of the Tortricidae listed the following species:

Accra amanica Razowski, 2005
Accra canthararcha (Meyrick, 1937)
Accra erythrocyma (Meyrick, 1930)
Accra kassaicola Razowski, 2005
Accra kikuayana Razowski, 2005
Accra ornata Razowski, 1966
Accra plumbeana Razowski, 1966
Accra rubicunda Razowski, 1966
Accra rubrothicta Razowski, 1986
Accra tanzanica Razowski, 1990
Accra venatrix (Meyrick, 1930)
Accra viridis (Walsingham, 1891) - type species (as Argyrotoxa viridis)
Accra witteae Razowski, 1964

See also
List of Tortricidae genera

References

 , 2005: World Catalogue of Insects vol. 5 Tortricidae.
 , 1964: Discussion of Some Groups of Tortricini (Tortricidae, Lepidoptera) with Descriptions of New Genera and Species. Acta Zoologica Cracoviensia, 9 (5): 357–416.
 , 2005: Notes and descriptions of primitive Tortricini from Tropical Africa, with a list of Asian taxa (Lepidoptera: Tortricidae). Shilap Revista de Lepidopterologia 33 (132): 423–436. .
  2010: An annotated catalogue of the types of Tortricidae (Lepidoptera) in the collection of the Royal Museum for Central Africa (Tervuren, Belgium) with descriptions of new genera and new species. Zootaxa 2469: 1–77. Abstract: .

Tortricini
Tortricidae genera
Taxa named by Józef Razowski